The following is a list of churches in the Anglican Diocese of Leeds.

Archdeaconries and deaneries 

*including a Cathedral

Churches

Outside deanery structures

Deanery of Aire and Worth

Deanery of Inner Bradford

Deanery of Outer Bradford

Deanery of South Craven and Wharfedale

Deanery of Almondbury

Deanery of Dewsbury & Birstall

Deanery of Brighouse and Elland

Deanery of Calder Valley

Deanery of Halifax

Deanery of Huddersfield

Deanery of Kirkburton

Deanery of Allerton

Deanery of Armley

Deanery of Headingley

Deanery of Whitkirk

Deanery of Barnsley

Deanery of Pontefract

Deanery of Wakefield

Deanery of Bowland and Ewecross

Deanery of Harrogate

Deanery of Richmond

Deanery of Ripon

Deanery of Skipton

Deanery of Wensley

Dedications 
This table is drawn from the above lists.

References 

Anglican Diocese of Leeds
Leeds